"Fire" is the 3rd single off the album "Krystal Meyers", by Krystal Meyers. Fire peaked at No. 9 on the Christian Rock Charts.

About "Fire"

"Fire" is "about being on fire for God." It was composed by Krystal Meyers, Andrew Bojanic, Ian Eskelin, Elizabeth (Liz) Hooper  and appears on: "Krystal Meyers", self-titled album, Release Date: June 7, 2005  and Krystal Meyers [Bonus Track], Release Date: August 28, 2006. It was included in WOW Hits 2007 (track 30), Release Date: October 3, 2006.

References

2005 singles
Krystal Meyers songs
Songs written by Krystal Meyers
Songs written by Ian Eskelin
Essential Records (Christian) singles
2005 songs
Song recordings produced by Ian Eskelin